Private Casper R. Carlisle (1841 to April 29, 1908) was an American soldier who fought in the American Civil War. Carlisle received the country's highest award for bravery during combat, the Medal of Honor, for his action during the Battle of Gettysburg in Pennsylvania on 2 July 1863. He was honored with the award on 21 December 1892.

Biography
Carlisle was born in Allegeheny County, Pennsylvania in 1841. He enlisted into the Independent Pennsylvania Light Artillery. He died on 29 April 1908 and his remains are interred at the Mount Lebanon Cemetery in Mount Lebanon, Pennsylvania.

Medal of Honor citation

Carlisle earned the Medal at the Peach Orchard.

See also

List of Medal of Honor recipients for the Battle of Gettysburg
List of American Civil War Medal of Honor recipients: A–F

References

1841 births
1908 deaths
People of Pennsylvania in the American Civil War
Union Army officers
United States Army Medal of Honor recipients
American Civil War recipients of the Medal of Honor